Ardis Butterfield is a scholar of medieval music and literature. She is the Marie Borroff Professor of English, and Professor of Music and French at Yale University United States.

Education 
Butterfield read English at Trinity College, Cambridge, followed by a Master's degree in medieval literature at the University of Bristol, both in England, after which she returned to Trinity College to complete a PhD. Her PhD was entitled 'Interpolated lyric in medieval narrative poetry' (1988).

Career 
In 2009, Butterfield co-founded the Medieval Song Network, a research group, in London, England, UK.

In 2012, Butterfield became a professor of English at Yale University.
In 2018, Butterfield became a senior research fellow at University of Cambridge. In 2018, Butterfield had been appointed as the Marie Borroff Professor of English at Yale University. Butterfield is leading a team to develop a Digital Archive of Medieval Song.

Awards 
 R.H. Gapper Prize

Bibliography
 The Familiar Enemy: Chaucer, Language and the Nation in the Hundred Years War (Oxford University Press, 2009)
 Poetry and Music in Medieval France (Cambridge University Press, 2003)
 ed. Chaucer and the City

References

External links 
 Yale-Digital Archive of Medieval Song Project description
 Performing Medieval Text at mhra.org.uk
 New Chaucer Society

Living people
Year of birth missing (living people)
Yale University faculty
Alumni of Trinity College, Cambridge
Alumni of the University of Bristol
British musicologists